The annual flowering plant Gilia achilleifolia is known commonly as California gilia, California gily-flower, and blue gilia. It is native to California but grows in other areas of North America where it has been introduced.

The plant is erect with long stems that bear bunches of funnel-shaped lavender flowers. It is a member of the phlox family.

References

External links
Jepson Manual Treatment

achilleifolia
Flora of California
Flora without expected TNC conservation status